Hubert Pryer Pearson (15 May 1886 – October 1955) was an English professional footballer who played as a goalkeeper for West Bromwich Albion.

Career

Club career
Pearson participated in the 1912 FA Cup Final. He spent his entire professional career, spanning 18 years, with West Bromwich Albion.

International career
Pearson was once selected for the English national squad at the age of 37, but didn't appear due to injury.

Personal life
Pearson was the father of Harold Pearson, and the uncle of Harry Hibbs and Horace Pearson.

Honours
West Bromwich Albion
FA Cup finalists: 1912

References

1886 births
1955 deaths
Sportspeople from Tamworth, Staffordshire
English footballers
Association football goalkeepers
Tamworth F.C. players
West Bromwich Albion F.C. players
English Football League players
English Football League representative players
FA Cup Final players